Rufin Yambe (born 17 June 1981 in N'Djamena) is a Chadian professional football player, he plays for Renaissance FC.

Career
He has played for the Chad national football team.

External links
 

1981 births
Living people
Chadian footballers
Chadian expatriate footballers
Expatriate footballers in Gabon
Chad international footballers
Chadian expatriate sportspeople in Gabon
People from N'Djamena
Association football midfielders
AS Stade Mandji players